Man Alive may refer to:

Film and television
Man Alive (1945 film), American romantic comedy
Man Alive! (1952 film), 1952 American documentary short
Man Alive (British TV series), 1965–1981 documentary and current affairs series
Man Alive (Canadian TV program), 1967–2000 faith and spirituality program

Literature
Manalive, 1912 novel by G. K. Chesterton
"Man Alive" (short story), 1947 Nero Wolfe mystery novella by Rex Stout
Man Alive! (play), a 1955 comedy play by John Dighton
Man Alive!, 2013 novel by Mary Kay Zuravleff
Man Alive (book), 2014 nonfiction book by Thomas Page McBee

Music
"Man Alive" (song), a 1992 song by Diesel
Man Alive (band), Israeli punk rock band formed in 1999
Man Alive, a 2003 album by Eugene Kelly
Man Alive! (Stephen Stills album), 2005
Man Alive (Man Alive album), 2008
Man Alive (Everything Everything album), 2010
"Man Alive!", song by Billy Talent from Dead Silence (album), 2012
A Man Alive, a 2016 album by Thao & The Get Down Stay Down
Man Alive! (King Krule album), 2020